Swinging Safari is a 2018 Australian comedy-drama film starring Guy Pearce, Kylie Minogue, Radha Mitchell, Julian McMahon, Asher Keddie, and Jeremy Sims. It was written and directed by Stephan Elliott, most famous for his work on the film The Adventures of Priscilla, Queen of the Desert, released in 1994. Swinging Safari was released in Australia on 18 January 2018, with international territories following later in the year.

Originally titled Flammable Children, the final title references the 1962 global hit "A Swingin' Safari" by Bert Kaempfert. The tune is heard on the soundtrack and its album cover is seen on screen during the film.

Cast

Hall Family
 Guy Pearce as Keith Hall
 Kylie Minogue as Kaye Hall
 Jesse Denyer as Gerome Hall
 Jacob Kotan as Andrew Hall
 Alex Kotan as Damien Hall
 Chelsea Jamieson as Liz Hall
 Ava Taylor as Keira Hall
Jones Family
 Radha Mitchell as Jo Jones
 Julian McMahon as Rick Jones
 Darcey Wilson as Melly Jones
 Imogen Hess as Young Melly
 Ethan Robinson as Liam Jones
 James Calder as Cal Jones
Marsh Family
 Asher Keddie as Gale Marsh
 Jeremy Sims as Bob Marsh
 Atticus Robb as Jeff Marsh
 Richard Roxburgh as Adult Jeff (The Narrator)
 Oscar Bailey as Young Jeff
 Chelsea Glaw as Bec Marsh
Other characters
 Jack Thompson as The Mayor
 Jacob Elordi as Rooster
 Drew Jarvis as Jehovah's Witness
 Sebastien Golenko as Dog
 Monette Lee as Mrs. Wilson
 Marcus Guinane as Mr. Logan
 Caleb Monk as Nigel Frost
 Renaud Jadin as Dave
 Stephan Elliott as Cop (uncredited)

Reception
The website's critics consensus reads: "Swinging Safari gathers an entertaining ensemble to offer audiences a messy yet ultimately endearing comedy rich with period detail."

References

External links
 
 

2018 films
2018 comedy-drama films
2010s English-language films
Films scored by Guy Gross
Films directed by Stephan Elliott
Films set in the 1970s
Australian comedy-drama films
Screen Australia films
2010s Australian films
English-language comedy-drama films